David Charles Lawrence (12 February 194110 June 1995) known as Bruno Lawrence was an English-born musician and actor, who was active in the industry in New Zealand and Australia.

Initially notable as a musician and founder of 1970s ensemble Blerta, he went on to well-regarded roles in several major films. His television work included starring in 1990s era Australian satirical series Frontline.

Early life
Born in Worthing, West Sussex, England in February 1941 he moved with his family to New Zealand in 1946. The family settled in New Plymouth before relocating to Wellington in 1948.

Music career
Lawrence spent most of his life in New Zealand, but also worked extensively in Australia. He was a jazz and rock drummer in many bands, including two years with Max Merritt & The Meteors in Sydney, Quincy Conserve, Blerta, and The Crocodiles. His last recording was with Bernie McGann, Larry Gales and Jonathan Crayford on "Jazz at the St. James" in 1989.  A remarkable show, it was repeated in 1990, this time with Vince Jones on vocals, Dave Addis on saxophone, Jonathan Crayford on piano, Rolf Stube on bass and added the New Zealand String Quartet.

In the early 1970s, Lawrence founded Blerta ("Bruno Lawrence's Electric Revelation and Travelling Apparition"). The multi and theatrical co-operative toured New Zealand and in parts of Australia. Blerta saw him performing alongside many people he would work with later as an actor, including director Geoff Murphy, and actors Martyn Sanderson and Ian Watkin.

Acting roles
Lawrence began acting in short films in the late 1960s. He won his first acting award, for television play Time Out, in 1971, although at this point music took up the majority of his time. By the late 1980s he had become one of New Zealand's most recognised actors on his own soil. Between 1981 and 1986 he was a much loved feature of many local films; he continued to act in occasional NZ productions through until 1993.

Lawrence's breakthrough movie role was relationship drama Smash Palace (1981). Playing the former race car driver who leaves with his daughter after the breakdown of his marriage, Bruno won an award at the Manila Film Festival, and acclaim from American critic Pauline Kael. Further acclaim came with his leading role as the lone scientist in Geoff Murphy's end-of-the-world tale, The Quiet Earth (1985), for which Bruno also helped write the script. He had earlier acted in Murphy's Utu (1983), about the New Zealand Wars of the 1860s, and cameoed in his breakthrough film Goodbye Pork Pie (1981). The Los Angeles Times compared his work in 1984 drama Heart of the Stag to that of "a young Brando".

Bruno's Australian roles included Anthony Hopkins movie Spotswood (aka The Efficiency Expert), Colleen McCullough adaptation An Indecent Obsession (playing a blind man), and 1986 miniseries The Great Bookie Robbery (playing gun-loving robber Cracka Park). In 1990, he portrayed John Peterson in the film, The Rogue Stallion. His last and, at least in Australia, best-known screen role was as devious, golf-loving TV producer Brian Thompson in 1990s satirical TV series Frontline.

Death
In 1994 while enjoying the success of the Australian television series Frontline, Lawrence was diagnosed with inoperable lung cancer. He died in Wellington, New Zealand, on 10 June 1995 at the age of 54.

A biography, Bruno: The Bruno Lawrence Story by Roger Booth, and television documentary Numero Bruno (2000, directed by Steve La Hood), cover his life and work. Lawrence is also featured in compilation documentary Blerta Revisited (2001, directed by Geoff Murphy).

Filmography
This is a selection of notable appearances.

Film
Wild Man (1977) – Wild Man
Goodbye Pork Pie (1980) – Mulvaney
A Woman of Good Character (1980) – Younger Son
Smash Palace (1981) – Al Shaw
Beyond Reasonable Doubt (1981) – Pat Vesey
Race for the Yankee Zephyr (1981) – Barker
Warlords of the 21st Century (aka Battletruck) (1982) – Willie
Carry Me Back (1982) – Motorway Traffic Cop
Prisoners (1982) – Peeky
Utu (1983) – Williamson
Wild Horses (1984) – Tyson
Heart of the Stag (1984) – Peter
Death Warmed Up (1984) – Tex
Pallet on the Floor (1984) – Ronald Hugh Morrieson
An Indecent Obsession (1985) – Matt Sawyer
The Quiet Earth (1985) – Zac Hobson
Bridge to Nowhere (1986) – Mac
Initiation (1987) – Nat Molloy
Rikky and Pete (1988) – Sonny
As Time Goes By (1988) – Ryder
Grievous Bodily Harm (1988) – Det. Sgt. Ray Birch
The Delinquents (1989) – Bosun
Spotswood (1992) – Robert, Carey's Father
Jack Be Nimble (1993) – Teddy
Gino (1994) – Mr. Palizetti (final film role)

Television
Time Out (1971)
Pukemanu (1971) – Biker
Special Squad (1984) – Arthur Poole
Pokerface (1986) – Ray 'Creepy' Crawley
The Great Bookie Robbery (1986) – Cracka Park
The Rainbow Warrior Conspiracy (1988) – Alan Galbraith
The Feds (1993, TV Movie) – Larry 'Icehouse' Porter
Frontline (1994) – Brian Thompson

Awards and nominations

Aotearoa Music Awards
The Aotearoa Music Awards (previously known as New Zealand Music Awards (NZMA)) are an annual awards night celebrating excellence in New Zealand music and have been presented annually since 1965.

! 
|-
| 1965 || "Bruno Do That Thing" || Single of the Year||  || 
|-

References

External links 
 
 Bruno Lawrence on NZ On Screen
 Bruno Lawrence on australianscreen online
 AudioCulture profile

1941 births
1995 deaths
Deaths from cancer in New Zealand
Deaths from lung cancer
English emigrants to New Zealand
New Zealand expatriates in Australia
New Zealand musicians
People from Worthing
New Zealand male film actors
20th-century New Zealand male actors